Hazen High School may refer to:

 Hazen High School (Arkansas), located in Hazen, Arkansas
 Hazen High School (North Dakota), located in Hazen, North Dakota
 Hazen High School (Washington), located in Renton, Washington
 Hazen Union School, located in Hardwick, Vermont